Various names have been applied to what is known as the Vietnam War. These have shifted over time, although Vietnam War is the most commonly used title in English. It has been variously called the Second Indochina War, the Vietnam Conflict, and Nam (colloquially 'Nam). In Vietnam it is commonly known as Kháng chiến chống Mỹ (Resistance War against America).

Second Indochina War

The name "Second Indochina War" places the conflict into context with other distinct, but related, and contiguous conflicts in Southeast Asia. Vietnam, Laos, and Cambodia are seen as the battlegrounds of a larger Indochinese conflict that began at the end of World War II and lasted until communist victory in 1975. This conflict can be viewed in terms of the demise of colonialism and its after-effects during the Cold War.

Vietnam Conflict

The term "Vietnam Conflict" is largely a U.S. designation that acknowledges the fact that the United States Congress never declared war on North Vietnam. Legally, President Dwight Eisenhower used his constitutional discretion—supplemented by supportive resolutions in Congress—to conduct what was said to be a "police action"; President Lyndon Johnson intensified military operations starting in 1964, as a result of the Gulf of Tonkin Resolution.

Resistance War against America (Kháng chiến chống Mỹ)
For people in Vietnam, the common phrase is Kháng chiến chống Mỹ (literally Resistance War against America). "Resistance War against America to Save the Nation" is the more formal term used by the Vietnam government; it is more of a saying than a name, and its meaning is self-evident.

References

Vietnam War